Total size of protected area of Bosnia and Herzegovina amounts of , which is 1,13% of its entire territory. This is a list of areas protected by corresponding levels of the government of Bosnia and Herzegovina, namely at the entity's levels, and with various categorizations.

National parks
National parks of Bosnia and Herzegovina listed as follows:

Nature parks
Nature parks of Bosnia and Herzegovina listed as follows:

Areas proposed for protection
Following are areas proposed for protection or in procedure of being established as a protection zones of appropriate categorization:

 Prenj-Čvrsnica-Čabulja-Vran National Park with Blidinje Nature Park
 Igman-Bjelašnica-Treskavica-Visočica with Rakitnica Canyon National Park

See also 
 List of National Monuments of Bosnia and Herzegovina
 List of World Heritage Sites in Bosnia and Herzegovina

References

External links
Una National Park
Sutjeska National Park
Kozara National Park
Drina National Park
Hutovo Blato – Nature Park
Blidinje – Nature Park

Bosnia and Herzegovina
 
p

Protected areas
Tourism in Bosnia and Herzegovina
p